Cerdon is a commune in the Ain department in eastern France.

It is known for its pink sparkling wine, and for its copper factory, the only one of its kind in France.  The 'Cuiverie' (copper factory) closed in 2010.

Population

Sights
 The Copper factory
 The caves (Grottes du Cerdon)
 Monument to the Maquis of Ain
 Fantasticable

See also
Communes of the Ain department

References

External links

Cuivrerie de Cerdon
Grottes du Cerdon 
Fantasticable

Communes of Ain
Ain communes articles needing translation from French Wikipedia